John Duncan Arthur (29 August 1929 – 19 May 2005) was a South African boxer who competed in the 1948 Summer Olympics.  He was born in Springs, South Africa.

Amateur career
Won the Heavyweight bronze medal for South Africa at the 1948 Summer Olympics in London.  Below are John Arthur's results from that tournament:

First round (round of 32): bye;

Round of 16:  defeated James Galli of France; referee stopped contest in first round;

Quarterfinal: defeated Jay Lambert of the United States on points;

Semifinal: lost to Rafael Iglesias of Argentina on points;

Bronze medal match: defeated Hans Müller of Switzerland by walkover

External links
 profile
Fight Record

1929 births
2005 deaths
Heavyweight boxers
Olympic boxers of South Africa
Boxers at the 1948 Summer Olympics
Olympic bronze medalists for South Africa
People from Springs, Gauteng
Olympic medalists in boxing
South African people of British descent
Medalists at the 1948 Summer Olympics
South African male boxers
Sportspeople from Gauteng